The gare de Pau is a railway station in Pau, Nouvelle-Aquitaine, France. The station is located on the Toulouse-Bayonne and Pau-Canfranc railway lines. The station is served by TGV (high speed trains), Intercités de Nuit (night trains), Intercités (long distance) and TER (local) services operated by the SNCF.

It is linked to the city centre by the Funiculaire de Pau, which climbs out of the valley to the Boulevard des Pyrénées and Place Royale. It is also served by buses and taxis.

Train services
The following services currently call at Pau:
TGV services Paris - Saint-Pierre-des-Corps - Bordeaux - Dax - Pau - Tarbes
intercity services (Intercités) Hendaye - Bayonne - Pau - Tarbes - Toulouse
local service (TER Nouvelle-Aquitaine) Bordeaux - Dax - Pau - Tarbes
local service (TER Nouvelle-Aquitaine) Bayonne - Pau - Tarbes
local service (TER Nouvelle-Aquitaine) Pau - Oloron-Sainte-Marie - Bedous
local service (TER Occitanie) Toulouse - Saint-Gaudens - Tarbes - Pau

References

Railway stations in Pyrénées-Atlantiques
Railway stations in France opened in 1863